Dominican Republic competed at the 2012 Summer Paralympics in London, United Kingdom from August 29 to September 9, 2012.

Athletics 

Men’s Field Events

Cycling

Road

Men

Track

Individual Pursuit

See also

 Dominican Republic at the 2012 Summer Olympics

References

Nations at the 2012 Summer Paralympics
2012
2012 in Dominican Republic sport